Tamir Nabaty (born 4 May 1991) is an Israeli chess Grandmaster and a two-time national chess champion (2013, 2016).

Chess achievements

Israeli and world championships
Tamir won the Israeli Chess Championship for the first time in Acre, Israel in 2013.

Tamir qualified for the Chess World Cup 2015, but lost on tiebreak in the first round to David Navara.

Tamir made a great result of 8.5/10 in the 3rd board of Israel in the 42nd Chess Olympiad Baku 2016.

Tamir won the Israeli Chess Championship for the second time in Tiberias in 2016.

Other tournaments
 First place in Albena 2010
 Second place in Chennai 2011
 First place in "Belgrade Trophy" 2012
 First place in the Czech Open Chess Festival in Pardubice 2012
 First place in Kavala 2013
 First place in Staufer 2014
 First Place in Forni di Sopra 2016
First place in the 2018 Shachar Arad Memorial with a score of 4.5/5
First place in the 2019 Israeli Open Championship with a score of 7.5/9
First place in the 2019 Natan Blumkin Memorial tied with Gad Rechlis and Johnatan Bakalchuk with a score of 8/10.
First place in the 2018-19 48th Rilton Cup in Stockholm with a score of 8/9

References

External links

Tamir Nabaty chess games at 365Chess.com

1991 births
People from Ness Ziona
Israeli chess players
Chess grandmasters
Living people
Chess Olympiad competitors